A public adjuster is a professional claims handler/claims adjuster who represents the insured/policyholder in their insurance claim. Depending on the state, licensed public adjusters are required to prove competency in a variety of ways; written examination, experience time frames, and background checks. In many states, a public adjuster is a lawful fiduciary under either state or federal jurisdiction (e.g. FEMA) to legally and professionally represent the rights of an insured/policyholder during a insurance claim. The role of a public adjuster is to recover the best possible indemnification for their claims. Individuals may prefer to avoid the stress of claims handling themselves, and choose public adjuster representation to guide them through the process and minimize the time which must be spent to file their claim properly. Public adjusters negotiate with insurance companies/carriers for an adjustment or settlement. Primarily, public adjusters review the applicable insurance policy to determine coverage for the loss, assess the cause of loss to determine applicable coverage, assist the insured to prepare detailed scope and cost estimates to prove their loss. Public adjusters also provide insurance policy interpretation to determine if coverage exists, and to negotiate with the insurance company/carrier to a final and fair settlement.[1] Most public adjusters charge a percentage of the settlement.

A public adjuster is a representative of the insured/policyholder who advises, manages, and submits a claim to the policyholder's insurance company. A public insurance adjuster advocates exclusively for policyholders.

There are generally three types of insurance claims adjusters: staff adjusters who are employed by an insurance company or a self-insured entity, independent adjusters who are independent contractors hired by the insurance company for individual claims, and public adjusters who are employed by the insureds/policyholders. "Company" or "independent" adjusters can only legally represent the rights of an insurance company.[2] Most adjusters are required to pass a state exam proving essential knowledge and competency. In some states, staff adjusters are exempt from licensing because their employer, the insurance company/carrier, carries the adjusters license.

Outside the United States adjusters are adjustors (with an "o") commonly called (or translated into English as) "insurance loss assessors" (or simply "loss assessors") and staff adjusters or independent adjusters are called or translated as "insurance loss adjustors" (or simply "loss adjustors").[3] However, there is a clear distinction between a loss adjustor, who works on behalf of an insurance company, and a loss assessor who works on behalf of a policyholder.

Licensing and regulation 

Currently, most states (and the District of Columbia) have in place some form of statute or regulation that licenses public adjusters. In addition, it is important to note that on October 14, 2005, the National Association of Insurance Commissioners (NAIC) adopted the Public Adjuster Licensing Model Act (MDL-228), which governs the qualifications and procedures for the licensing of public adjusters.[4] It defines a public adjuster as "any person who, for compensation or any other thing of value, acts on behalf of an insured", specifies the duties of and restrictions on public adjusters, including regulations for the following: examination, bond or letter of credit, continuing education, public adjuster fees, contracts, record retention, and standards of conduct. In addition, the model act states that public adjusters may only act or aid on the benefit of the insured in first-party claims.[5]

Holding a license in one state only permits the licensed to practice in that state. Although the regulations vary from state to state, the model act states that a non-resident can obtain a license in another state if their home state allows non-residents to apply for a license on the same basis.[5] This reciprocity agreement means that in many cases one can apply for a license in another state without having to pass that state's examination or pre-licensing education requirements.[6] Generally, public adjusters only work with insurance claims related to property damages and the business losses that they trigger such as business income, builders' risk, mechanical and electrical breakdown, extra expense and expediting expense, and leasehold interest; or homeowners' insurance including loss to dwelling structures, personal property, and additional living expenses or loss of rents. Although it is uncommon for public adjusters to handle casualty/personal injury loss or health insurance claims, in some states such as Florida they are legally authorized to handle claims in all lines of insurance except life and annuities.[7]

Duties 

The public adjusters' main responsibilities are to:

Evaluate existing insurance policies in order to determine what coverages may be applicable to a claim
Research, detail, and substantiate damage to buildings and contents and any additional expenses
Evaluate business interruption losses and extra expense claims for businesses
Determine values for settling covered damages
Prepare, document and support the claim on behalf of the insured
Negotiate a settlement with the insurance company on behalf of an insured
Re-open a claim and negotiate for additional settlements if a discrepancy is found after the claim has been settled
Typically a policyholder hires a public adjuster to document and expedite their claims and to insulate themselves from the stress of engaging in an adversarial role with a large corporation. The burden of presenting a professional claim to an insurer can be alleviated by the work of a public adjuster.

Public adjusters must be able to recognize a claim that may be insubstantial and disputable and explain such problems to the client, and to clarify definitions of policy terms.

Fees 

Most public adjusters are paid based on a percentage of the total settlement. Typical public adjuster fees range from 5% on larger claims to 25% on smaller or re-opened claims. Some public adjuster contracts contain a percentage fee, with a "not to exceed cap" that limits payment after a certain amount. In some states, the percentage fee is capped as a matter of law.

Other methods of compensation are hourly rates, lump sum contracts, and regressive scale percentage contracts. Regardless of the method of fee computation, an existing state law fee cap would still apply.

It is important to note that a public adjuster cannot ethically obtain more than the policyholder is legitimately entitled to.

When to contact 

Shortly after the insurance company receives notice of a loss, an adjuster representing the insurance company will visit the policyholder to gather facts about how the loss occurred, the amount of the loss, and any possibility of subrogation. Incorrect, incomplete or inadequately expressed answers to the adjuster's questions may affect the coverage; a public adjuster engaged early in the process, before or during the fact-finding stage, will have more opportunity to help the policyholder best present their claim.
  
Many public adjusters offer a free consultation, and many go further and offer free inspections of the damages including a policy coverage review at no cost. It is not detrimental to contact a public adjuster for a property loss at any point in the claim; a professional can guide a policyholder in the right direction even if the public adjuster is not retained.

References

Further reading

External links
 Metropolitan's VP Radio Interview with Access radio. Glenn Nahmias' Q&A session on public adjusters (1 hour)

Legal professions
Financial services occupations